KHPA is a radio station airing a country music format licensed to Hope, Arkansas, broadcasting on 104.9 MHz FM.  The station is owned by Newport Broadcasting Company.

References

External links
KHPA's official website

Country radio stations in the United States
HPA